Repyakhovka is a rural locality (a selo) and the administrative center of Repyakhovskoye Rural Settlement, Krasnoyaruzhsky District, Belgorod Oblast, Russia. The population was 777 as of 2010. There are 12 streets.

Geography 
Repyakhovka is located 18 km northwest of Krasnaya Yaruga (the district's administrative centre) by road. Grafovka is the nearest rural locality.

References 

Rural localities in Krasnoyaruzhsky District